Pterostylis subtilis, commonly known as the thin mountain greenhood, is a species of orchid endemic to New South Wales. It has a rosette of leaves and when flowering a single translucent white flower with dark green lines, a narrow, deeply notched sinus between the lateral sepals and a curved, protruding labellum.

Description
Pterostylis subtilis is a terrestrial, perennial, deciduous, herb with an underground tuber and a rosette of fleshy leaves lying flat on the ground. The dorsal sepal and petals are fused to form a hood or "galea" over the column, the dorsal sepal slightly longer than the petals and all sharply pointed. There is a narrow gap at each side of the flower between the petals and lateral sepals. Flowering occurs in December and January.

Taxonomy and naming
Pterostylis subtilis was first described in 2006 by David Jones and the description was published in Australian Orchid Research from a specimen collected in the Barrington Tops National Park. The specific epithet (subtilis) is a Latin word meaning "thin", "fine", "slender" or "acute ".

Distribution and habitat
The thin mountain greenhood grows with grasses on sheltered forest slopes in the Barrington Tops National Park.

References

subtilis
Orchids of New South Wales
Plants described in 2006